Jakub Nemec (born 11 January 1992) is a Slovak footballer who plays for ASV Siegendorf as a centre back.

Club career
Nemec made his Fortuna Liga debut for Senica against Žilina on 8 August 2020.

References

External links
 FK Senica official club profile 
 
 Futbalnet profile 
 

1992 births
Living people
Slovak footballers
Association football defenders
SK Dynamo České Budějovice players
PŠC Pezinok players
ŠK Plavecký Štvrtok players
FC Rohožník players
MFK Skalica players
FC Petržalka players
FK Senica players
3. Liga (Slovakia) players
4. Liga (Slovakia) players
2. Liga (Slovakia) players
Slovak Super Liga players
Expatriate footballers in the Czech Republic
Slovak expatriate sportspeople in the Czech Republic
Expatriate footballers in Austria
Slovak expatriate sportspeople in Austria